'Mahanoro is a rural municipality located in the Atsinanana region of eastern Madagascar, along the coast.

It is located 9 km north of the mouth of the Mangoro River.  The Canal des Pangalanes is nearby, and the "Chutes de la Sahatsio" waterfalls are 18 km north of town.  Though a small airport is situated on the north side of the town, the location is quite isolated and with limited tourism, though it is reported to have a single hotel.

There is a lighthouse on a cape just south of the town, constructed in 1936, and in poor repair.

Fokontany
21 fokontany (villages) belong to this municipality:
Androhomanasa, Ambohimiarina, Maroahitra, Ambohitsara I, Ambilabe, Ambinanisasika, Bemangahazo, Ambodiriana Lohariana, Tandroroho, Miakara, Androrangambo, Maintimbato, Sahabe, Fiadanana, Vohitromby, Tanambao I, Ambalakininina, Ankadirano, Tanamborozano, Ambalamangahazo and Papagnambo.

Roads
Only one road leads to Mahanoro: northswards to Toamasina the National road 11a

References
RAKOTONDRAFARA, 2016.PROJET D’EXTENSION URBAINE DE LA VILLE DE MAHANORO

Populated places in Atsinanana
Populated coastal places in Madagascar